Beder Julio Caicedo Lastra (born 13 May 1992, in San Lorenzo) is an Ecuadorian professional footballer who plays as a left back for Independiente del Valle

International goals
Scores and results list Ecuador's goal tally first.

Career statistics

Club

References

External links 

1992 births
Living people
People from San Lorenzo, Ecuador
Ecuadorian footballers
Association football midfielders
Ecuadorian Serie A players
Ecuadorian Serie B players
C.D. ESPOLI footballers
C.D. Técnico Universitario footballers
Delfín S.C. footballers
Barcelona S.C. footballers
C.S.D. Independiente del Valle footballers
Ecuador international footballers
2019 Copa América players